Palmer Land is the portion of the Antarctic Peninsula, Antarctica that lies south of a line joining Cape Jeremy and Cape Agassiz. This application of Palmer Land is consistent with the 1964 agreement between the Advisory Committee on Antarctic Names and the UK Antarctic Place-Names Committee, in which the name Antarctic Peninsula was approved for the major peninsula of Antarctica, and the names Graham Land and Palmer Land for the northern and southern portions, respectively.  The line dividing them is roughly 69° S.

Boundaries
In its southern extreme, the Antarctic Peninsula stretches west, with Palmer Land eventually bordering Ellsworth Land along the 80° W line of longitude. Palmer Land is bounded in the south by the ice-covered Carlson Inlet, an arm of the Filchner-Ronne Ice Shelf, which crosses the 80° W line. This is the base of Cetus Hill.

This feature is named after Nathaniel Palmer, an American sealer who explored the Antarctic Peninsula area southward of Deception Island in the sloop Hero in November 1820.

Features

Mountain ranges and isolated peaks
Briesemeister Peak
Carey Range
Columbia Mountains
Dana Mountains
Engel Peaks
Mount Peterson
Mount Pitman
Mount Poster
Mount Southern
Mount Strong
Mount Sullivan
Pegasus Mountains
Mandolin Hills
O'Sullivan Peak
Renner Peak
Waitt Peaks

Nunatuks
It was named by the UK Antarctic Place-Names Committee after Aldebaran, an orange-colored star that is the brightest in the constellation of Taurus.

Other
Cape Rymill
Rhino Rock
Scott Uplands

See also
Flagon Point
Foster Peninsula
Giannini Peak
Graham Spur
Hall Ridge
Heirtzler Ice Piedmont
Hogmanay Pass

References

 
British Antarctic Territory
Lands of Antarctica